George Ripley may refer to:
George Ripley (alchemist) (died 1490), English author and alchemist
George Ripley (transcendentalist) (1802–1880), American social reformer, Unitarian minister and journalist